Five ships of the Royal Navy have been named HMS Magicienne. The origins of the name are from the French word for a female magician or sorceress and were used following the capture of the French frigate Magicienne in 1781.

  was a fifth-rate French frigate captured in 1781 and destroyed at the Battle of Grand Port in 1810.
  was a fifth-rate frigate built in 1812 and broken up in 1845.
  was a frigate built in 1849 and broken up in 1866.
  was a  built in 1888 and sold in 1905.
  was an  built in 1944 and broken up in 1956.

Royal Navy ship names